GDP-L-fucose synthetase is an enzyme that in humans is encoded by the TSTA3 gene.

Tissue specific transplantation antigen P35B is a NADP(H)-binding protein. It catalyze the two-step epimerase and the reductase reactions in GDP-D-mannose metabolism, converting GDP-4-keto-6-D-deoxymannose to GDP-L-fucose. GDP-L-fucose is the substrate of several fucosyltransferases involved in the expression of many glycoconjugates, including blood group ABH antigens and developmental adhesion antigens. Mutations in this gene may cause leukocyte adhesion deficiency, type II.

References

Further reading

External links 
 PDBe-KB provides an overview of all the structure information available in the PDB for Human GDP-L-fucose synthase